Fayet-Ronaye is a commune in the Puy-de-Dôme department in Auvergne in central France.

History
Initially, Ronaye and Fayet were two separate villages, hence the presence of a church in both of them. They used to belong to the family of Grellet de la Deyte in XVIII century. Benoît Grellet de la Deyte was seigneur of Saint-Quentin (in the Somme Department)and of Fayet-Ronaye.  Feudal remains (presumably, ruins of the family castle of Grellet de la Deyte) are situated between Frissonet, one of the hamlets of Fayet-Ronaye, and Saint-Germain-l'Herm.

Historical monuments

Dissard's tumulus

According to the researcher Coste ("Supplément au monument druidique de Tuniac"), a burial mound, known as the Dissard's tumulus, located 1 km south away from the center of the village, contained the rests of the druidic chef and his Celtic supporters chased by the army of Marcus Licinius Crassus. The site had been a high place of veneration for the locals. Other researchers argue that the whole legend is a fake.

Cromlech of Frissonnet
Situated between Fayet and Saint-Germain-l'Herm, the Cromlech of Frissonnet represents a square formed with megalithic standing stones.

Runiac's feudal remains
The remains are situated near Frissonnet. Jean Olléon presumes it might be the remains of the family castle of Grellet de la Deyte.

See also
Communes of the Puy-de-Dôme department

References

Jean Olléon, Mégalithes et traditions religieuses et populaires en Livradois et Forez, Éditions Créer, 1992

J.-P. Dissard, "Famille Dissard-Cavard" dans Revue héraldique de Rome, 1904

M. Boudet, "Le prétendu Tuniac" dans Bulletin historique et scientifique de l'Auvergne, 1913, pp. 358–379

External links
Local association organizing village festivals, garage sales and publishing a local newspaper "Vivre à Fayet-Ronaye" 

Fayetronaye